Ida Bagus Oka (16 April 1936 – March 7, 2010 ) was the Governor of Bali, Indonesia from 1988 to 1998. He was also a State Minister of Population/Chairman of Planned Families National Coordinating Body in the Development Reform Cabinet under Jusuf Habibie.  During the Indonesian killings of 1965–1966, Ida Bagus Oka instigated the Balinese Hindus  to hunt down PKI supporters.  He told Hindus: "There can be no doubt [that] the enemies of our revolution are also the cruelest enemies of religion, and must be eliminated and destroyed down to the roots".  During this period, an estimated 80,000 Balinese were killed, roughly 5 percent of the island's population at the time..  In 2001, Oka was convicted in a corruption case involving  Rp. 2.3 billion and was sentenced for one year.

References

External links
Bali World Statesmen
 PROF. DR. IDA BAGUS OKA, MD - UN

1938 births
Governors of Bali
Balinese people
Indonesian Hindus
2010 deaths